Riversdale is a suburb of Blenheim, in the Marlborough region of the South Island of New Zealand. To the south, Islington is similarly separated on three sides by the Ōpaoa.

The Nelson Marlborough Institute of Technology has its Marlborough Campus in Riversdale.

Demographics
Riversdale and Islington cover .

Riversdale-Islington had a population of 2,319 at the 2018 New Zealand census, an increase of 249 people (12.0%) since the 2013 census, and an increase of 168 people (7.8%) since the 2006 census. There were 852 households. There were 1,179 males and 1,140 females, giving a sex ratio of 1.03 males per female. The median age was 38.3 years (compared with 37.4 years nationally), with 414 people (17.9%) aged under 15 years, 492 (21.2%) aged 15 to 29, 1,011 (43.6%) aged 30 to 64, and 402 (17.3%) aged 65 or older.

Ethnicities were 81.1% European/Pākehā, 20.7% Māori, 5.3% Pacific peoples, 6.2% Asian, and 2.6% other ethnicities (totals add to more than 100% since people could identify with multiple ethnicities).

The proportion of people born overseas was 17.1%, compared with 27.1% nationally.

Although some people objected to giving their religion, 56.8% had no religion, 30.8% were Christian, 0.4% were Hindu, 0.5% were Muslim, 0.8% were Buddhist and 3.5% had other religions.

Of those at least 15 years old, 186 (9.8%) people had a bachelor or higher degree, and 456 (23.9%) people had no formal qualifications. The median income was $28,900, compared with $31,800 nationally. The employment status of those at least 15 was that 1,014 (53.2%) people were employed full-time, 255 (13.4%) were part-time, and 72 (3.8%) were unemployed.

References

Suburbs of Blenheim, New Zealand
Populated places in the Marlborough Region